Matthew Knight (born  1993/1994) is a former Canadian actor known for his roles in Queer as Folk, as Ethan Morgan in My Babysitter's a Vampire, and as Jake Kimble in The Grudge film series. Since then he has appeared in over a dozen television series, more than ten television movies and a number of feature-length and short films. He has been nominated seven times for a Young Artist Award and has won twice, for his performance in Candles on Bay Street (2006) and Gooby (2009).

Career 
Knight's first leading role in a feature film was Will Burton in Big Spender (2003). After performing on various television shows, he appeared in Peep (2004 and in The Greatest Game Ever Played (2005) as Young Francis Ouimet. In 2006, he appeared in the werewolf film Skinwalkers. He later appeared in The Grudge 2 (2006) and The Grudge 3 (2009) as Jake Kimble.

Knight later appeared The Good Witch (2008), The Good Witch's Garden (2009), The Good Witch's Gift (2010), The Good Witch's Family (2011) and The Good Witch's Charm (2012). He also starred in the television movie and series My Babysitter's a Vampire. He has starred in the episodes, "Alien Candy" and "Checking Out" of the TV series, R.L. Stine's The Haunting Hour.

Personal life
Knight resided in Mount Albert, Ontario and attended Unionville High School where he was in the performing arts program. He has an older brother, Jack Knight, and sister, Tatum Knight, who are also actors.

Filmography

Film

Television

Awards and nominations

References

External links 
 

Year of birth missing (living people)
Living people
Place of birth missing (living people)
Canadian male film actors
Canadian male television actors
Canadian male voice actors
21st-century Canadian male actors